Christopher Fitzgerald may refer to:

Christopher Fitzgerald (artist) (born 1977), American transmedia artist
Christopher Fitzgerald (actor) (born 1972), American actor and performer